Germán Genaro Cipriano Gómez Valdés y Castillo (19 September 1915 – 29 June 1973), known professionally as Tin-Tan, was a Mexican actor, singer and comedian who was born in Mexico City but was raised and began his career in Ciudad Juarez, Chihuahua. He often displayed the pachuco dress and employed pachuco slang in many of his movies, some with his brothers Manuel "El Loco" Valdés and Ramón Valdés. He made the language of the border Mexican, known in Spanish as fronterizos  pachucos, famous in Mexico. A "caló" based in Spanglish, it was a mixture of Spanish and English in speech based on that of Mexicans on the Mexican side of the border, specifically Ciudad Juarez.

Origin of name 
Tin Tan began his career by calling himself Topillo (slang for the trickster), which a friend of his stated sounded too vulgar and uncouth for a comedian. He suggested instead the nickname "Tin-Tan" (based on the sound of bells ringing), which Valdés originally disliked but grew to like and use professionally for his whole career.

Career

Valdés' film career came as a complete surprise to everyone. He used to work as a sweeper for the XEJ station in Ciudad Juarez when he decided to try and mimic the radio announcers for fun. Unbeknownst to him, the actual announcer had left the microphone on. His quick wit and funny personality garnered him acclaim and he was quickly promoted to the main radio announcer himself. It was under these circumstances that legendary ventriloquist Paco Miller contacted him to act in films, and his career began.

He usually acted alongside his "carnal" (blood brother), Marcelo Chávez, who also accompanied Tin-Tan with a guitar. He was a prominent figure during his golden years in film, from 1949 onward. His 1948 film, Calabacitas tiernas, a comedy, was chosen as one of the best in Mexican cinema .

Valdés boasted of his record of "having kissed the most actresses" in his career , some of them considered the beauties of their day. Some of his co-stars were Marga López, Rosita Quintana, Silvia Pinal, Amalia Aguilar, Meche Barba, Ana Bertha Lepe, María Antonieta Pons, Tongolele and many more. He also collaborated closely with actress and comedian Fannie Kauffman, who was also known as Vitola, during their careers.

He was also one of several people who were originally intended to be on the front cover of The Beatles' Sgt. Pepper's Lonely Hearts Club Band but declined the invitation. He requested that Ringo swap him for a Mexican tree known as "El Arbol de la Vida", the Tree of Life, which he did. 

He was the voice of Baloo the bear and Thomas O'Malley the cat in the Mexican Spanish dubbing of the Disney films The Jungle Book and The Aristocats; both roles were originally voiced by Phil Harris.

Valdés was the subject of the 2005 documentary, Ni Muy Muy... Ni Tan Tan... Simplemente Tin Tán, by Manuel Márquez and Carlos Valdés, son of the comedian.

Death

Valdés became ill with hepatitis, which degenerated into cancer. He then fell into a hepatic coma and died.

When he died he did not leave a fortune, just a testament to his wife Rosalía and his children Rosalía and Carlos.

He left behind a legacy of over a hundred film, 11 records, and two short films. The only recognition he received was the Virginia Fábregas Medal, a medal given for 25 years of professional service by the Association of Actors of Mexico.

Legacy
On 19 September 2019, the 104th anniversary of his birth, Tin-Tan was honored with a Google Doodle that reached Central America, Iceland, Italy and Sweden.

Selected filmography

 El que la traga, la paga (1943)
 Summer Hotel (1944)
 The Disobedient Son (1945) as Germán Rico / Tin Tan
 Song of Mexico (1945) as Tin Tan (uncredited)
 The Noiseless Dead (1946)
 Music Inside (1947) as Tin Tán / Hortensia
 The Lost Child (1947) as Agustín peón Torre y Rey; Tincito
 Music, Poetry and Madness (1948) as Tin Tan
 Tender Pumpkins (1949) as Tin tan
 Rough But Respectable (1949) as Tin Tan
 No me defiendas, compadre (1949) as Tin Tan
 El rey del barrio (1950) as Tin Tan
 The Mark of the Skunk (1950) as Tin / El vizconde de Texmelucan
 También de dolor se canta (1950) as Tin Tan
 Sinbad the Seasick (1950) as Simbad
 El revoltoso (1951) as Tin Tan
 Oh Darling! Look What You've Done! (1951) as Tin Tan
 Kill Me Because I'm Dying! (1951) as Tin-Tan
 When Women Rule (1951)
 Las locuras de Tin-Tan (1952) as Tin-Tan
 Snow White (1952) as Valentín Gaytán
 Chucho the Mended (1952) as Tin Tan / Valentín Gaytán
 Mi campeón (1952) as Tin Tan
 The Beautiful Dreamer (1952) as Triquitrán
 You've Got Me By the Wing (1953) as Tin Tan
 The Island of Women (1953) as Tin Tan
 The Vagabond (1953) as La Chiva
 God Created Them (1953) as Tin Tan
 The Unknown Mariachi (1953) as Agustín / Tin Tan
 Reportaje (1953) as Pachuco composer
 El vizconde de Montecristo (1954) as Inocencio Dantés
 El hombre inquieto (1954) as Germán Valdés / Abel Caim
 Bluebeard (1955) as Ricardo
 Look What Happened to Samson (1955) as Tin Tan / Sansón
 Barefoot Sultan (1956) as Sultán Casquillo
 El vividor (1956) as Atliano Valadez
 El médico de las locas (1956) as Apolonio Borrego
 Teatro del crimen (1957) as Germán Valdés, cantante
 Las aventuras de Pito Pérez (1957) as Pito Pérez; Jesús Pérez Gaona
 El campeón ciclista (1957) as Cleto García
 Puss Without Boots (1957) as Agustín Tancredo (El Gato) / Don Victorio Tancredo
 Locos peligrosos (1957) as Federico
 Los tres mosqueteros y medio (1957) as Federico
 Escuela para suegras (1958) as Tin Tan
 Refifi entre las mujeres (1958) as Refifí
 Viaje a la luna (1958)
 Quiero ser artista (1958) as Tin Tan
 Música de siempre (1958)
 A Thousand and One Nights (1958) as Ven Aquí
 La odalisca No. 13 (1958) as Quintín
 Paso a la juventud (1958) as Casimiro
 Tres lecciones de amor (1959) as Germán Valadez
 Vagabundo y millonario (1959) as Antonio García / Andrés Aguilar
 El cofre del pirata (1959)
 Ferias de México (1959)
 El que con niños se acuesta (1959) as Chon / Encarnación Bernal
 Dos fantasmas y una muchacha (1959) as Germán Pérez
 Escuela de verano (1959) as Casimiro Bellavista y Manduriano
 Vivir del cuento (1960) as Crisoforo Pérez (Choforo)
 La casa del terror (1960) as Casimiro
 Variedades de medianoche (1960) as Germán Gómez
 Rebel Without a House (1960) as Teodoro Silva
 La tijera de oro (1960) as Pablo Emilio Campos
 Tin-Tan y las modelos (1960) as Marcos Alonso Chimalpopoca
 Una estrella y dos estrellados (1960) as Tin Tán
 El violetero (1960) as Lorenzo Miguel
 The Phantom of the Operetta (1960) as Aldo / Baldomiro Valdes
 El pandillero (1961) as Pepe Álvarez del Monte
 El duende y yo (1961) as Modesto Fauno
 Locura de terror (1961) as Pacifico otero
 ¡Suicídate, mi amor! (1961) as Raúl González
 Viva Chihuahua (1961)
 Pilotos de la muerte (1962) as Octano Pérez y Pérez
 ¡En peligro de muerte! (1962) as Marshall Nylon
 El tesoro del rey Salomón (1963) as Tin Tan
 Fuerte, audaz y valiente (1963)
 Tin-Tan el hombre mono (1963) as Tin Tan
 Face of the Screaming Werewolf (1965) as Man Who Sleeps in Wax Museum and Saves Woman in Apartment
 Tintansón Crusoe (1965) as Tin-Tan Cruz / Guaraní
 Los fantasmas burlones (1965) as Cyril Ludovico Churchill
 Especialista en chamacas (1965) as Don Guille
 Puerto Rico en carnaval (1965)
 Loco por ellas (1966) as Ángel Macías / Alberto Macías / Padre de Ángel y Alberto
 El ángel y yo (1966) as Rito
 Detectives o ladrones (1967) as Harry
 Seis días para morir (1967) as José - Globero
 Chanoc (1967)
 Duelo en El Dorado (1969) as Compadre Barrera
 Gregorio y su ángel (1970) as Devil
 El capitán Mantarraya (1970) as Capitán Mantarraya
 Chanoc en las garras de las fieras (1970) as Tin Tan / Tsekub Baloyán
 El quelite (1970) as Proculo
 Trampa para una niña (1971)
 En estas camas nadie duerme (1971)
 El ogro (1971) as Sabas
 Caín, Abel y el otro (1971)
 Chanoc contra el tigre y el vampiro (1972) as Tsekub Baloyán
 The Incredible Professor Zovek (1972) as Chalo
 Los cacos (1972)
 Las tarántulas (1973) as Tsekub Baloyán
 La Disputa (1974)
 Acapulco 12-22 (1975) as Pirata
 La mafia amarilla (1975) as Germán
 Noche de muerte (1972) as Germán (final film role)

References

External links
 
  Documentary film contents at TuCinePortal, Perla Schwartz.
  Así era Tin Tan at SuperMexicanos, Guillermo Aguilera.

1915 births
1973 deaths
Golden Age of Mexican cinema
Mexican male comedians
Mexican male film actors
Mexican people of Spanish descent
Mexican people of Italian descent
Male actors from Mexico City
Singers from Mexico City
20th-century Mexican male actors
20th-century comedians
20th-century Mexican male singers